The 2018 PRO Chess League Season was the second season of the PRO Chess League. It began on January 17 and ended on April 8 with the Armenia Eagles defeating the Chengdu Pandas to claim their first title. This season introduced new qualifications to join the league and an all-star game.

Qualification 
In order to combat the large league, Shahade decided to cut the league from 48 teams to 32 teams as he believed the inaugural season was "a bit too large and chaotic".In order to determine which teams would return, he used the following:

 24 teams invited
 6 teams per Qualifier Tournament
 2 teams per fan vote

Qualification tournament 
The qualification tournament took place on November 3 with two qualifiers. The event format was stated on the PRO Chess League website.

 13 round individual Swiss using time format of three minutes with two seconds of increment
 Scores determined by adding sum of scores from all four team members
 Top 2 teams from each qualifying tournament automatically qualify for PCL

*Won fan vote to qualify for Stage 2

Super Saturday and Super Sunday 
For 2018, the PCL introduced a new match format which allowed teams to play outside of their division. In these matches, each team played one single four-game match against eight other teams on Saturday, and another eight on Sunday. Once every team had played sixteen other teams, the total match points were added up. The following prizes were given:

 1st: 1 match win + $500
 2nd-6th: 1 match win
 7th-10th: 1 match draw
 11th-16th: 1 match loss

Standings 
The top four teams from each division qualify for the playoffs while the two worst teams are relegated from the league and will have to partake in the qualifiers in order to rejoin the league.

Playoffs 
After the regular season, the top four teams from each division qualified for the playoffs with the teams being seeded 1–4 in their division. In addition, the teams that won their division were invited to play the final two round in San Francisco at the Folsom Street Foundry.*Advanced due to higher seed

**Advanced due to higher draw odds

***Triple overtime victory

Awards 

Notes:

= All-Star Game 
The 2018 All-Star Game was on September 8 with stage 1 and on September 9 for stage 2. The following event format was used.

 Stage 1: Round-robin tournament where every player plays one game against everyone else from other three teams, total of 12 games (Time control = 3|1)
 Stage 2:  Knockout round. Seeding determined by total number of points in stage 1 (Time control = 3|0)

References 

2018 in chess